Omprakash Singh (born 13 May 1959) is an Indian politician. He has been elected as an MLA representing Ghazipur (Lok Sabha constituency) in 2022 Uttar Pradesh Legislative Assembly election. He has been elected for the 7th term. He has also represented Ghazipur in the 12th Lok Sabha from 1998 to 1999. He is a member of the Samajwadi Party.

In his two years as an MP, he was a member of the Committee on Commerce and its Sub-Committee on Textiles.

From 2003 to 2007 he was the Uttar Pradesh Cabinet Minister for Irrigation, and then from 2012 to 2017 he was the Cabinet Minister for Tourism in the Akhilesh Yadav ministry. He was also a member of the Consultative Committee for the Ministry of Coal, the Railway Convention Committee, and the committee to review the rate of dividend payable by the Railway Undertakings to General Revenues.

In 2012, he was elected to the Indian Legislative Assembly, representing Zamania, while remaining a cabinet minister in the Uttar Pradesh Government for the Samajwadi Party.

References

People from Ghazipur 
Living people
1959 births
Politicians from Ghazipur